The Men's 200 metres event  at the 2005 European Athletics Indoor Championships was held on March 5–6. This was the last time the 200 metres were contested at European Indoor Championships.

Medalists

Results

Heats
The winner of each heat (Q) and the next 9 fastest (q) qualified for the semifinals.

Semifinals
First 2 of each heat (Q) qualified directly for the final.

Final

References
Results

200 metres at the European Athletics Indoor Championships
2005 European Athletics Indoor Championships